Emeryville is a city located in northwest Alameda County, California, in the United States. It lies in a corridor between the cities of Berkeley and Oakland, with a border on the shore of San Francisco Bay. The resident population was 12,905 as of 2020. Its proximity to San Francisco, the Bay Bridge, the University of California, Berkeley, and Silicon Valley has been a catalyst for recent economic growth.

It is the home to Pixar Animation Studios, Peet's Coffee & Tea, the Center for Investigative Reporting, Alternative Tentacles and Clif Bar. In addition, several well-known tech and software companies are located in Emeryville: LeapFrog, Sendmail, MobiTV, Novartis (formerly Chiron before April 2006), and BigFix (now HCL).  Emeryville attracts many weekday commuters due to its position as a regional employment center.

Emeryville has some features of an edge city; however, it is located within the inner urban core of Oakland/the greater East Bay. It was industrialized before the First World War.

History

Early history
Before the colonization of the area by Spain in 1776, this area was long the site of indigenous settlements. The historic Ohlone Native Americans encountered the Spaniards and later European colonists. They thrived on the rich resources of the bayside location: gathered clams from the mudflats, oysters from the rocky areas, caught fish, and hunted a variety of game. In addition, women gathered acorns from the local oak trees, roots, and fruit.  The Ohlone discarded clam and oyster shells in a single place, over time creating a huge mound, now known as the Emeryville Shellmound.

During the Spanish and Mexican eras, colonists constructed a small wharf near the mouth of Temescal Creek adjacent to the shellmound. The wharf served the Peralta family's Rancho San Antonio. It was used for loading cattle hides, the principal product of the ranch, onto lighters, and transferring them to ocean-going ships, including New England–bound schooners.

Cattle were a major part of the economy into the American era, when numerous meat packing plants were established along the bayshore in Emeryville between 67th and 63rd streets, in an area called "Butchertown". The cattle processed here were raised in nearby ranches and farms, and brought in by rail or barge. The odors from the corrals and slaughterhouses were notorious and often mentioned in local newspapers of the 19th and early 20th century.

Emeryville's first post office opened in 1884.

The Town of Emeryville was incorporated December 2, 1896. It was named after Joseph Stickney Emery, who came during the California Gold Rush and acquired large tracts of land in what became known as "Emery's". In 1884, Emery was president of a narrow-gauge railroad called the California and Nevada Railroad. The railroad was originally intended to extend from Oakland, through Emery's (at the time, an unincorporated settlement along the bayshore) and east across the Sierra Nevada to the gold mining town of Bodie, California. From Bodie the railroad would extend east through Nevada to a connection with the Denver & Rio Grande Railroad. Despite these goals, the railroad was completed only from Oakland to Orinda. Its right-of-way was sold to the Santa Fe Railway. The Santa Fe constructed a rail yard and passenger depot below San Pablo between 41st Street and Yerba Buena Avenue. Although located in Emeryville, when the depot opened in 1902, it was called "Oakland" after the larger community.

20th century and beyond

The Key System, a local transit company, acquired the general offices of the California and Nevada and its nascent pier into San Francisco Bay. Key developed the pier to reach nearly to Yerba Buena Island. The Key System established its main rail yard adjacent to the yard of the Santa Fe in a large tract west of San Pablo Avenue. It was in the vicinity of Yerba Buena Avenue (so named because the island was visible in line with the thoroughfare). The Key System's main power plant, used to drive its electric streetcars and commuter trains, was constructed adjacent to the city limits with Oakland. The immense smokestack was a local landmark for decades, surviving until being damaged in the Loma Prieta earthquake of 1989. It was demolished for safety reasons shortly thereafter.

The old Key System mainline to the pier, and later, to the Bay Bridge, ran in a subway below Beach Street and the Southern Pacific mainline near the power plant. That subway survives. Today it is used as a private entrance to the main sewage treatment plant of East Bay Municipal Utility District (EBMUD, the water utility serving Oakland and many surrounding cities).

In the late 1980s and early 1990s, after the Santa Fe spun off its real estate development arm, this company acquired the rail yards and shops of the Key System and Santa Fe. This real estate was redeveloped by what was called the Catellus Development Corporation, as a shopping center and multi-unit residential district.

In the late 19th century, the city developed a large park around the shellmound. This included two dance pavilions, one of which was built on top of the shellmound. The Oakland Trotting Park, for Standardbred horse racing, was built nearby at the junction of the Berkeley Branch line with the mainline of the Southern Pacific.  The old Emeryville Arena was torn down in February 1920, to make way for a new idea for a new venue to revive the sport of dog racing, but using what the Oakland Tribune described as an "automatic rabbit".

On May 29, 1920, the first greyhound racing track to employ a mechanical lure in place of a live rabbit opened in Emeryville.

In the early 20th century, Emeryville was as well known for its gambling houses and bordellos as it was for its booming industrial sector. Earl Warren, then Alameda County district attorney, later California governor and Chief Justice of the United States, described it as "the rottenest city on the Pacific Coast". During Prohibition and the Great Depression, Emeryville was a site of numerous speakeasies, racetracks and brothels; it became known as a somewhat lawless red light center. Today's popular local restaurant, The Townhouse, was operated as a speakeasy during Prohibition. The Oaks Room Card Club operates today as a legal gambling establishment on San Pablo Avenue.

Emeryville was the site of Oaks Park, the home turf of the Pacific Coast League's Oakland Oaks. The ballpark was located on the block bounded by San Pablo, 45th Street and Park Street (the fourth side was Watts Street). The site is now partly empty and fenced off. It is overlapped by Pixar Studios. Pixar's main gate (on Park Street) lies directly on the old segment of Watts Street. The stadium did not front directly on San Pablo, where a strip of various small commercial buildings stood. They were replaced by the current, one-story commercial building housing several chain businesses.

During World War II, Emeryville was the southern terminus of the Shipyard Railway, a specially constructed electric rail line operated by the Key System to transport defense workers to the Kaiser Shipyards in Richmond. The station was on the west side of San Pablo Avenue on the Key's yard property. The tracks led to San Pablo Avenue, where they were merged into existing streetcar tracks.

From the late 19th into the early 20th century, Emeryville continued development as an industrial city. Joining the meat-packing plants were the Judson Iron Works and the Sherwin-Williams paint company. From 1939 until the 1970s, the Sherwin-Williams plant roof featured a massive animated neon sign showing a can of red paint tilting, spilling, and covering a globe of the earth — with the slogan "Cover the Earth".  It was a familiar sight to eastbound motorists on the Bay Bridge.

For decades the city was also the location of Shell Development, the research arm of Shell Oil Company; it relocated in 1972 to Houston, Texas. A large scrap metal yard (part of the Judson Steel mill) and its distinctive neon "Judson Steel" sign were visible for decades from the Eastshore Freeway until the mid-1980s. A large facility of the Pacific Intermountain Express (PIE) trucking firm was also visible. A heavy truck manufacturing division of what was formerly International Harvester, later Navistar, was located in Emeryville. One of its more popular over-the-road semi-truck models, the International DCO-405, became commonly and affectionately known as an "Emeryville".

By the late 1960s, industries were beginning to move away from Emeryville. With the loss of jobs, the city declines. This began to change in the mid 1970s starting with the development of the marina section of Emeryville. The Judson steel mill abruptly shut down in the fall of 1986, after more than 100 years of operation, in the wake of declining profits and contentious labor negotiations.

By the late 1980s, a large shopping area had begun to develop north and south of the Powell Street corridor. Additionally, the Chiron Corporation (now Novartis), a major biotechnology company, established its headquarters just south of the old junction of the SP mainline tracks and the old Berkeley branchline (Shellmound Junction) at the end of Stanford Avenue, the site of the old Shellmound trotting course.

Following the Loma Prieta earthquake in 1989, a new Amtrak depot was built in Emeryville to replace the former 16th Street Station in West Oakland. It had been deteriorating even before it was seriously damaged by the quake. The Emeryville station serves Amtrak's California Zephyr, Coast Starlight, San Joaquin, and Capitol Corridor trains. The California Zephyr originates here with service daily to Chicago, Illinois via Salt Lake City, Utah and Denver, Colorado. Buses link the station with San Francisco.

In the late 1980s the Emeryville Public Market opened; this farmers' market also features up to twenty restaurants.

By the 1990s, the former tracts of the Santa Fe and Key System yards were redeveloped as a large shopping and residential area, as was the Shellmound corridor. Development of these areas included major roadwork, with the extension of 40th Street. The work included construction of a large overpass across the Southern Pacific (now Union Pacific) railroad tracks; it connected 40th Street to an extension of Shellmound Street, creating a single thoroughfare linking two sections of the new Emeryville. On the northern stretch of Shellmound Street, the Emery Marketplace and a movie multiplex were built. In 2007, the western end of Yerba Buena Avenue was linked with the northern end of the Mandela Parkway, creating a new through route between Emeryville and West Oakland.

In 2001, the city contracted developer Madison Marquette to build a new shopping center, the Bay Street Shopping Center. It was to be built on the site of a defunct paint factory. But this was a historic site of an Ohlone village and sacred burial ground. Madison Marquette developers worked with archaeologists and Ohlone tribe representatives in order to avoid disturbing the human remains. The tribe approved reinterment of some remains at an undisclosed location on the site. The completed mall displays photographs of the historic shellmound, but it does not mention the burial grounds. An Ohlone representative said they believed the information would make shoppers there uncomfortable.

Geography

Named Watergate, the Emeryville marina is home to a mixed-use development, including two marinas (one public, the other private), a park, a residential condominium community known as Watergate, a business park with several office buildings, and several restaurants.

Mudflats and other environmental features

At one time, the Emeryville Mudflats were famous for their stench. In the 19th and early 20th century, this was caused by the effluent from the "Butchertown" area, where several meat-packing plants operated along the bayshore. They also dumped stripped carcasses in the bay here. Later, untreated sewage from Emeryville, Oakland, and Berkeley flowed directly into the bay over the mudflats, producing hydrogen sulfide gas, particularly noticeable on warm days. In the 1950s the East Bay Municipal Utility District constructed a regional sewage treatment plant near the eastern terminus of the San Francisco–Oakland Bay Bridge, which, for the most part, cured the noxious problem.

The Emeryville Mudflats became notable in the 1960s and 1970s for public art, erected (with neither permission nor compensation) from driftwood timbers and boards by professional and amateur artists and art students from local high schools, UC Berkeley, the California College of Arts and Crafts and the Free University of Berkeley. The mudflats were even featured in the 1971 film Harold and Maude. These unsanctioned works were admired by some drivers heading westbound on the San Francisco–Oakland Bay Bridge from Interstate 80.

In the late 1990s, the sculptures and materials were removed in the interest of establishing a more natural and undisturbed marshland for the nurturing of wildlife. This process continues around the bay in many other wetlands, former diked grazing fields, and salt production evaporation ponds.

Historically, Emeryville had been the location of a number of heavy industrial uses such as Judson Steel, whose properties were developed by bringing in waste and construction debris fill from San Francisco in the early 1900s. Correspondingly much of the underlying soil contained heavy metals, hydrocarbons and other soil contaminants. Much of this contamination was removed in the 1980s when the considerable wave of redevelopment occurred. The population had increased to almost 7,000 by the year 2000. Since then, the population has continued to grow and is estimated by General Plan projects a population of 16,600 by 2030. In addition, the city is home to about 20,000 current jobs; this number is projected to increase to about 30,000 by 2030.

Climate
Emeryville has a Mediterranean climate.

Demographics

2010 
The 2010 United States Census reported that Emeryville had a population of 10,080. The racial makeup of Emeryville was 4,490 (44.5%) White, 1,764 (17.5%) Black, 44 (0.4%) Native American, 2,775 (27.5%) Asian, 16 (0.2%) Pacific Islander, 348 (3.5%) from other races, and 643 (6.4%) from two or more races. Hispanic or Latino of any race were 927 persons (9.2%).

The Census reported that 10,007 people (99.3% of the population) lived in households, 73 (0.7%) lived in non-institutionalized group quarters, and 0 (0%) were institutionalized.

There were 5,694 households, out of which 692 (12.2%) had children under the age of 18 living in them, 1,240 (21.8%) were opposite-sex married couples living together, 435 (7.6%) had a female householder with no husband present, 160 (2.8%) had a male householder with no wife present.  There were 481 (8.4%) unmarried opposite-sex partnerships, and 119 (2.1%) same-sex married couples or partnerships. 2,871 households (50.4%) were made up of individuals, and 530 (9.3%) had someone living alone who was 65 years of age or older. The average household size was 1.76.  There were 1,835 families (32.2% of all households); the average family size was 2.61.

The population was spread out, with 1,031 people (10.2%) under the age of 18, 1,064 people (10.6%) aged 18 to 24, 4,675 people (46.4%) aged 25 to 44, 2,304 people (22.9%) aged 45 to 64, and 1,006 people (10.0%) who were 65 years of age or older.  The median age was 35.0 years. For every 100 females, there were 97.8 males.  For every 100 females age 18 and over, there were 98.8 males.

The homeowner vacancy rate was 9.3%; the rental vacancy rate was 10.2%.  3,365 people (33.4% of the population) lived in owner-occupied housing units and 6,642 people (65.9%) lived in rental housing units.

2000 
As of the census of 2000, there were 6,882 people, 3,975 households, and 1,164 families residing in the city. The racial makeup of the city as of 2010 is 40.2% non-Hispanic White, 27.3% Asian, 17.2% non-Hispanic Black or African American, 0.2% Native American, 0.2% Pacific Islander, 5.2% from two or more races, and 0.4% from other races. 9.2% of the population are Hispanics or Latinos of any race.

There were 3,975 households, out of which 10.7% had children under the age of 18 living with them, 18.0% were married couples living together, 8.3% had a female householder with no husband present, and 70.7% were non-families. 55.5% of all households were made up of individuals, and 9.0% had someone living alone who was 65 years of age or older. The average household size was 1.71 and the average family size was 2.69.

In the city, the population was spread out, with 11.4% under the age of 18, 13.4% from 18 to 24, 42.2% from 25 to 44, 23.3% from 45 to 64, and 9.8% who were 65 years of age or older. The median age was 35 years. For every 100 females, there were 100.2 males. For every 100 females age 18 and over, there were 100.0 males.

The median income for a household in the city was $45,359, and the median income for a family was $57,063. Males had a median income of $49,333 versus $39,527 for females. The per capita income for the city was $33,260. About 6.3% of families and 13.2% of the population were below the poverty line, including 4.5% of those under age 18 and 8.0% of those age 65 or over. According to the U.S. Census Bureau, 2009 Population Estimates, 9,866 people resided in Emeryville in 2009.

Politics

According to the California Secretary of State, as of February 10, 2019, Emeryville has 6,654 registered voters. Of those, 4,152 (62.4%) are registered Democrats, 306 (4.6%) are registered Republicans, and 1,914 (28.8%) have declined to state a political party.

Current development

Emeryville Center for Community Life is a joint project of the City of Emeryville and the Emery Unified School District developed by the Nexus Partners. The new center will be constructed at the site of the existing Emery Secondary School, which along with Anna Yates School will be closed once the center is completed. The center will consist of a new three-story multi-use campus, incorporating an elementary school, secondary school, community center, and space for social service providers, plus preschool and day-care facilities, multi-use sports fields and community theater. Site work would start in summer 2012 with construction in 2014 and the center opening scheduled for fall 2016.

Schools
Emery Unified School District serves the students in Emeryville and parts of Oakland. Its schools, both in the same site, are Anna Yates Elementary School and Emery Secondary School.

 German International School of Silicon Valley operates a campus in the former Anna Yates school building. In 2018 this campus will close and reorganize into a separate school, called the East Bay German International School.

Ex'pression College for Digital Arts is a private, for-profit university located in Emeryville.

Economy 

As of July 1, 2019, businesses with 55 or fewer employees working within the geographic boundaries of the city must pay each employee at least $16.30 per hour. Large businesses with 56 or more employees must pay the same rate (previously the rate differed based on employee count). Many businesses have set up headquarters in the city. Companies based in Emeryville include:
Adobe Systems, a multinational technology software company headquartered in San Jose. 
Alibris Inc., an online supplier and retailer of used and rare books founded in 1997 by Martin Manley and Richard Weatherford.
Alternative Tentacles, an independent record label launched in 1979, specializing in punk and alternative music, founded and run by former Dead Kennedys singer/songwriter Jello Biafra. Home to the music of Biafra, Wesley Willis, The Dicks, D.O.A., and many other acts. Although founded in San Francisco (where a post office box mailing address is maintained), the label's actual office and warehouse space are in Emeryville.
Amyris, a biotech integrated renewable products company that is enabling the world's leading brands to achieve sustainable growth.
Bayer, formerly Novartis Biopharma division (Chiron Corporation prior to April 2006): a biotech and research company and manufacturer of biopharmaceuticals
Berkeley Research Group, LLC (BRG), a services and consulting firm co-founded by David Teece
BigFix (IBM), a software company that provides endpoint management services
Bionovo, a biotechnology company focused on the discovery and development of drugs to treat cancer and women's health issues such as hot flashes and vaginal atrophy associated with menopause
BrandAds, an online video analytics company
The Center for Investigative Reporting, a nonprofit investigative journalism organization
Cetus Corporation, (acquired by Chiron in 1991) one of the first biotechnology companies. Working from the old Shell Development buildings on Horton Street, they produced two significant pharmaceuticals, Betaseron and Proleukin. They also developed the PCR process, which won a Nobel Prize for its inventor in 1993.
Clif Bar, a natural foods maker
Electronic Arts, the world's largest video game maker, had Will Wright's Spore development team Maxis based here until March 2015.
Gracenote, a company that maintains and licenses an Internet-accessible database containing information about the contents of audio compact discs (acquired by Sony Corporation of America in 2008)
Grocery Outlet, a discount supermarket chain 
Innovative Interfaces, Inc, a supplier of integrated library system software
Jamba Juice a restaurant retailer
Kodak Gallery (formerly Ofoto.com), an Internet digital photo service whose products include photo prints and gifts
Leapfrog, an educational toy company best known for its LeapPad, a paper-based electronic reading toy
Lithium Technologies, a social customer relationship management (SCRM) company. (Moving to San Francisco by June, 2013.)
Match Analysis, the maker of the leading video and statistical analysis system for professional soccer
Peet's Coffee, specialty coffee roaster and retailer
Pixar, a major animation and computer graphics firm known for award-winning shorts, and feature films. Pixar was bought by The Walt Disney Company in 2006.
SeeqPod, a search and recommendation web site
ZipRealty, an internet-based realty company

Retail centers
As part of an urban renewal project, several shopping centers opened in the late 1990s next to the intersection of Interstate highways 80 and 580, capitalizing on Emeryville's access to San Francisco as well as to East Bay customers. Among these centers' anchor tenants is IKEA and Home Depot. A new retail and residential development named Bay Street Emeryville now sits along Highway 80 and is home to such merchants as Banana Republic, GAP, Coach and the Apple Store, and restaurants such as California Pizza Kitchen and Pasta Pomodoro. The complex is anchored by AMC Theatres and is located next to IKEA.

Prior to the company's dissolution, Pets.com was headquartered in Emeryville.

Top employers

According to the city's 2018 Comprehensive Annual Financial Report, the top employers in the city are:

Transportation

The Emeryville Amtrak station was completed in 1994 and serves four intercity rail lines:
 California Zephyr, as the western terminus of interstate service to Chicago
 Capitol Corridor, which is an intrastate commuter rail train between San Jose and Auburn via Sacramento
 Coast Starlight, which offers interstate service between Seattle and Los Angeles
 San Joaquins, an intrastate train between Sacramento and Bakersfield; Emeryville is on the branch to Oakland via Stockton
Emeryville is the primary San Francisco Bay Area station/stop for the two interstate lines, serving approximately 500,000 passengers annually; it replaced a station in West Oakland that was damaged in the 1989 Loma Prieta earthquake and was designed by Heller Manus Architects. Amtrak does not provide direct rail service to any city on the San Francisco Peninsula, including San Francisco. San Francisco passengers use a bus connector to Emeryville station, routed over the Bay Bridge, with a stop near the Transbay Transit Center.

Bay Area Rapid Transit (BART) is a commuter/metro heavy rail system which connects San Francisco, Oakland, and San Jose in the greater Bay Area.

Public transit bus service for Emeryville is provided by AC Transit, which covers the East Bay counties of Alameda and Contra Costa. To supplement the local bus service, the city operates a free shuttle service called Emery Go Round with 15 minute headways on weekdays; it serves MacArthur BART, the Amtrak station, the Bay Street shops, the Watergate condominium complex and nearby marina, and other locations throughout the city and into Berkeley.

Freeway access to Emeryville is provided by a key section of Interstate 80, just north of where that freeway meets Interstate 880 and Interstate 580 in a major interchange known as the MacArthur Maze.

Emeryville also maintains a small marina with limited services. There is a standing citizen Bicycle Pedestrian Advisory Committee.

In popular culture
Pixar produced the movie The Incredibles, which shows a part of Emeryville near their headquarters, in a map on the dashboard of the hero's car. Their film Cars (2006) briefly shows a "Welcome to Emeryville" sign. Pixar's Luca shows Emeryville's zip code for a few seconds being used as a number for a train. 
Emeryville is often referenced in the NBC dramedy series Parenthood, as the home of Sarah Braverman, the second oldest of the four siblings.
The city of Emeryville is a mecha training grounds in the Mecha Samurai Empire series by Peter Tieryas and is featured prominently as the site of the yearly mecha combat between the Berkeley Military cadets.

Notable people
Emeryville residents include NBA player Draymond Green, first Filipino American city council member and mayor Dianne Martinez, and architect Kofi S. Bonner.

See also

Notes

References
 C. Michael Hogan, Michael J. Johnson et al., Environmental Impact Report for the Eastshore Center Development in the Redevelopment Project Area of the City of Emeryville, prepared for the city of Emeryville by Earth Metrics Inc., Burlingame, Calif., July 1986.
 Emeryville General Plan, volumes I and II (1979).
 Final Environmental Impact Report, Bay Center Development, prepared by the city of Emeryville (1985).

External links

 

 
Cities in Alameda County, California
Cities in the San Francisco Bay Area
Incorporated cities and towns in California
Populated places established in 1896
Populated coastal places in California
1896 establishments in California